
Year 451 (CDLI) was a common year starting on Monday (link will display the full calendar) of the Julian calendar. At the time, it was known as the Year of the Consulship of Marcianus and Adelfius (or, less frequently, year 1204 Ab urbe condita). The denomination 451 for this year has been used since the early medieval period, when the Anno Domini calendar era became the prevalent method in Europe for naming years.

Events 
 By place 
 Europe 
 Spring – Attila gathers his vassals—Bastarnae, Gepids, Heruls, Ostrogoths, Rugians, Scirians and Thuringians (among others), and smashes through Germany, causing widespread panic and destruction. He arrives in Belgica with an army (50,000 men) and crosses the Rhine. 
 April 7 – Attila's forces invade Gaul and sack Metz. The major cities of Strasbourg, Worms, Mainz, Trier, Cologne, Reims, Tournai, Cambrai, Amiens and Beauvais are destroyed by the Huns. 
 Eudocia, daughter of Emperor Valentinian III, marries Huneric in Ravenna. The engagement serves to strengthen the alliance between the Western Roman Empire and the Vandal Kingdom.
 June – Attila approaches Aurelianum (modern Orléans) and the city's inhabitants close the gates, forcing him to lay siege. After learning of the Hun invasion, Flavius Aetius (magister militum) moves quickly from Italy into Gaul, and joins forces with  Visigoth king Theodoric I.
 June 20 – Battle of the Catalaunian Plains (Châlons): Attila avoids a pitched battle near Orléans, and withdraws to the Catalaunian Plains (Champagne-Ardenne). The Roman coalition defeats the Huns, but Theodoric I is killed in the encounter. This is one of the last military victories of the Western Roman Empire, before the victories of Emperor Majorian against the Alemanni, Visigoths, Suebi and Burgundians, between 457 and 461.
 Thorismund succeeds his father Theodoric I as king of the Visigoths. He is crowned in the capital at Toulouse, and extends the Visigothic Kingdom in Hispania.

 Persia 
 May 26 – Battle of Vartanantz: King Yazdegerd II defeats the  Armenian army (66,000 men) under their rebel leader Vartan Mamikonian on the Avarayr Plain (Armenia). Despite the loss of Mamikonian, who is killed, the Armenians consider this battle to have been a moral and religious victory, since Yazdegerd, out of respect for their efforts, allows them to remain Christian. The anniversary is a national and religious holiday.
 Yazdegerd II issues a decree to abolish the Shabbat, and orders the execution of Jewish leaders, including the Exilarch.

 By topic 
 Religion 
 October 8–November 1 – Council of Chalcedon, an ecumenical council of the Church: The monophysitism of Eutyches is repudiated, and the Chalcedonian Definition set forth. As a result of this council, the Oriental Orthodox Churches eventually become a separate communion. More immediately, Jerusalem becomes a Patriarchate, and Dioscorus of Alexandria is deposed as Patriarch of Antioch.

Births 
 Brigit of Kildare, Irish patron saint (approximate date)
 Jacob of Serugh, Syrian poet and theologian (approximate date)

Deaths 
 July 29 – Tuoba Huang, prince of Northern Wei (b. 428)
 Theodoric I, king of the Visigoths
 Liu Yikang, prince of the Liu Song dynasty (b. 409)
 Pei Songzhi, Chinese historian (b. 372)

References